Jonas Andersen may refer to:

 Jonas Solberg Andersen (born 1981), Norwegian ice hockey player
 Jonas Andersen (speedway rider) (born 1992), Danish speedway rider